Nwe is a surname. Notable people with the surname include:

 Khin Moe Nwe (born 1973), Burmese weightlifter
 Nat Nwe (1933–2011), Burmese writer
 San San Nweh, Burmese writer and journalist
 Su Su Nwe (born 1971), Burmese democracy activist and political prisoner
 Yin Yin Nwe (born ), Burmese geologist